FC Olympia Hradec Králové is a Czech football club located in Hradec Králové. It currently fields only junior sides, its senior side relocated to Prague in 2017 and became FK Olympia Prague. The club was founded in 1901. The club has taken part in the Czech Cup on numerous occasions, reaching the third round in 2008–09, before losing 5–1 at home to Bohemians 1905.

History
The club was founded in 1901, making it the oldest football club in Hradec Králové. The team played under the name TJ Montas Hradec Králové following a name change in 1981. Olympia advanced to the Czech Fourth Division in 1995, remaining there for seven consecutive seasons. In 2001–2002, the club was relegated. Another relegation soon followed, but the club bounced back to the Regional Championship one year later, where they have played since then. The club relocated to Prague before the start of the 2017–18 Czech National Football League and became FK Olympia Prague.

References

External links
 

Football clubs in the Czech Republic
Association football clubs established in 1901
Sport in Hradec Králové
1901 establishments in Austria-Hungary
20th-century establishments in Bohemia